Claude Rajon (1866–1932) was a French politician. He served as a member of the Chamber of Deputies from 1897 to 1910, and from 1914 to 1919, as well as a member of the French Senate from 1921 to 1932, representing Isère.

References

1866 births
1932 deaths
Politicians from Vienne, Isère
Radical Party (France) politicians
Members of the 6th Chamber of Deputies of the French Third Republic
Members of the 7th Chamber of Deputies of the French Third Republic
Members of the 8th Chamber of Deputies of the French Third Republic
Members of the 9th Chamber of Deputies of the French Third Republic
Members of the 11th Chamber of Deputies of the French Third Republic
French Senators of the Third Republic
Senators of Isère